The 2021 Le Castellet Formula 3 round was the 2nd round of the 2021 FIA Formula 3 Championship. It took place at the Circuit Paul Ricard and ran from 18 to 20 June, featuring 3 races in support of the 2021 French Grand Prix.

Background
FIA Formula 3 last raced here in 2019. It was taken off in 2020 in favor of the Circuit Zandvoort. However, changes to the calendar due to the COVID-19 pandemic and a new cost-cutting measure meant that it returned for 2021. László Tóth tested positive for COVID before the weekend, and he was replaced by Pierre-Louis Chovet, who had been replaced at Jenzer by Johnathan Hoggard for sponsorship reasons. The round was originally scheduled to run from 25 to 27 June, but was rescheduled due to Formula One changing their calendar.

Classification

Qualifying 
The Qualifying session took place on 18 June 2021, with Frederik Vesti besting Dennis Hauger to take his first pole position of the season.

Sprint Race 1 

 Notes

  – Ido Cohen was given a 5 second time penalty for forcing Rafael Villagómez off the track on the final lap at turn 11.

Sprint Race 2 

Notes

  – Lorenzo Colombo received a 5 second time penalty for leaving the track and gaining an advantage at turn 9.

Feature Race

Standings after the event 

Drivers' Championship standings

Teams' Championship standings

 Note: Only the top five positions are included for both sets of standings.

See also 
2021 French Grand Prix

References 

|- style="text-align:center"
|width="35%"|Previous race:
|width="30%"|FIA Formula 3 Championship2021 season
|width="40%"|Next race:

Le Castellet Formula 3
Le Castellet Formula 3
Le Castellet Formula 3